Calvin Lewis Thomas (born January 7, 1960) is a former professional American football player who played running back for seven seasons for the Chicago Bears and Denver Broncos.

He is best known as the saxophone player in "The Super Bowl Shuffle".

References

1960 births
Living people
Players of American football from St. Louis
American football running backs
Chicago Bears players
Denver Broncos players
Illinois Fighting Illini football players